Yemeni League is the top football division of the Yemen Football Association. It was created in 1990 after the unification of North and South Yemen. It was set up in a four-level system with Premier, First, Second and Third Division.

16 northern and 16 southern clubs entered the top level championship in the 1990–91 season. Previously, two separate championships were used for North Yemen and South Yemen.

Currently, 14 clubs play at the top level, with four clubs being relegated to the 2nd tier. The season is generally run from early November to late June with the league winners entering the AFC Cup and Arab Champions League.

The league has been cancelled since 2014 to 2021, due to the civil war which also stopped all other footballing activities in the Middle Eastern country.

Clubs

Al Oruba appear to represent the small town of Zabid, but play all games in Sana'a.

Champions (before the unification)

Yemeni League champions

Top Goalscorers

All-time top scorers
As of 6 July 2013.

Topscorers by season

Total titles won

Al Yarmuk Al Rawda won championships in 1989 and 1990 as Al Yarmouk San'a'

Total titles won by town or city
Fourteen clubs from a total of five towns and cities have been champions.

References

External links
Official site 
 RSSSF
 Yemeni League – Hailoosport.com (Arabic)
 Yemeni League – Hailoosport.com

  
Football competitions in Yemen
Yemen